Dudchin is a rural locality (a selo) and the administrative center of Glukhovskoye Rural Settlement, Alexeyevsky District, Belgorod Oblast, Russia. The population was 5 as of 2010. There is 1 street.

Geography 
Dudchin is located 19 km southeast of Alexeyevka (the district's administrative centre) by road. Pyshnograyev is the nearest rural locality.

References 

Rural localities in Alexeyevsky District, Belgorod Oblast
Biryuchensky Uyezd